The historical trends in voter turnout in the United States presidential elections have been determined by the gradual expansion of voting rights from the initial restriction to white male property owners aged 21 or older in the early years of the country's independence to all citizens aged 18 or older in the mid-20th century. Voter turnout in United States presidential elections has historically been higher than the turnout for midterm elections.

Approximately 240 million people were eligible to vote in the 2020 presidential election and roughly 66.1% of them submitted ballots, totaling about 158 million. Biden received about 81 million votes, Trump about 74 million votes, and other candidates (including Jo Jorgensen and Howie Hawkins) a combined approximately 3 million votes.

History of voter turnout

Early 19th century: Universal white male suffrage
The gradual expansion of the right to vote from only property-owning men to including all white men over 21 was an important movement in the period from 1800 to 1830. Older states with property restrictions dropped them, namely all but Rhode Island, Virginia and North Carolina by the mid-1820s. No new states had property qualifications, although three had adopted tax-paying qualificationsOhio, Louisiana and Mississippi, of which only in Louisiana were these significant and long-lasting. The process was peaceful and widely supported, except in Rhode Island. In Rhode Island, the Dorr Rebellion of the 1840s demonstrated that the demand for equal suffrage was broad and strong, although the subsequent reform included a significant property requirement for any resident born outside of the United States. However, free black men lost voting rights in several states during this period.

The fact that a man was now legally allowed to vote did not necessarily mean he routinely voted. He had to be pulled to the polls, which became the most important role of the local parties. These parties systematically sought out potential voters and brought them to the polls. Voter turnout soared during the 1830s, reaching about 80% of the adult male population in the 1840 presidential election. Tax-paying qualifications remained in only five states by 1860Massachusetts, Rhode Island, Pennsylvania, Delaware and North Carolina.

Another innovative strategy for increasing voter participation and input followed. Prior to the presidential election of 1832, the Anti-Masonic Party conducted the nation's first presidential nominating convention. Held in Baltimore, Maryland, September 26–28, 1831, it transformed the process by which political parties select their presidential and vice-presidential candidates.

1870s: African American male suffrage
The passage of the Fifteenth Amendment to the United States Constitution in 1870 gave African American men the right to vote. While this historic expansion of rights resulted in significant increases in the eligible voting population and may have contributed to the increases in the proportion of votes cast for president as a percentage of the total population during the 1870s, there does not seem to have been a significant long-term increase in the percentage of eligible voters who turn out for the poll. The disenfranchisement of most African Americans and many poor whites in the South during the years 1890–1910 likely contributed to the decline in overall voter turnout percentages during those years visible in the chart below.

Early 1920s: Women's suffrage
There was no systematic collection of voter turnout data by gender at a national level before 1964, but smaller local studies indicate a low turnout among female voters in the years following women's suffrage in the United States. For example, a 1924 study of voter turnout in Chicago found that "female Chicagoans were far less likely to have visited the polls on Election Day than were men in both the 1920 presidential election (46% vs. 75%) and the 1923 mayoral contest (35% vs. 63%)." The study compared reasons given by male and female non-voters and found that female non-voters were more likely to cite general indifference to politics and ignorance or timidity regarding elections than male non-voters, and that female voter were less likely to cite fear of loss of business or wages. Most significantly, however, 11% of female non-voters in the survey cited a "Disbelief in woman's voting" as the reason they did not vote.

The graph of voter turnout percentages shows a dramatic decline in turnout over the first two decades of the twentieth century, ending in 1920 when the Nineteenth Amendment to the United States Constitution granted women the right to vote across the United States. But in the preceding decades, several states had passed laws supporting women's suffrage. Women were granted the right to vote in Wyoming in 1869, before the territory had become a full state in the union. In 1889, when the Wyoming constitution was drafted in preparation for statehood, it included women's suffrage. Thus Wyoming was also the first full state to grant women the right to vote. In 1893, Colorado was the first state to amend an existing constitution in order to grant women the right to vote, and several other states followed, including Utah and Idaho in 1896, Washington State in 1910, California in 1911, Oregon, Kansas, and Arizona in 1912, Alaska and Illinois in 1913, Montana and Nevada in 1914, New York in 1917; Michigan, South Dakota, and Oklahoma in 1918. Each of these suffrage laws expanded the body of eligible voters, and because women were less likely to vote than men, each of these expansions created a decline in voter turnout rates, culminating with the extremely low turnouts in the 1920 and 1924 elections after the passage of the Nineteenth Amendment.

This voting gender gap waned throughout the middle decades of the twentieth century.

Age, education, and income 

Age, income, and educational attainment are significant factors affecting voter turnout. Educational attainment is perhaps the best predictor of voter turnout, and in the 2008 election, those holding advanced degrees were three times more likely to vote than those with less than high school education. Income correlated well with the likelihood of voting as well. The income correlation may be because of a correlation between income and educational attainment, rather than a direct effect of income.

Age
The age difference is associated with youth voter turnout.
Some argue that "age is an important factor in understanding voting blocs and differences" on various issues. Others argue that young people are typically "plagued" by political apathy and thus do not have strong political opinions. As strong political opinions may be considered one of the reasons behind voting, political apathy among young people is arguably a predictor for low voter turnout. One study found that potential young voters are more willing to commit to voting when they see pictures of younger candidates running for elections/office or voting for other candidates, surmising that young Americans are "voting at higher and similar rates to other Americans when there is a candidate under the age of 35 years running". As such, since most candidates running for office are pervasively over the age of 35 years, youth may not be actively voting in these elections because of a lack of representation or visibility in the political process.

Recent decades have seen increasing concern over the fact that youth voter turnout is consistently lower than turnout among older generations. Several programs to increase the rates of voting among young peoplesuch as MTV's "Rock the Vote" (founded in 1990) and the "Vote or Die" initiative (starting in 2004)may have marginally increased turnouts of those between the ages of 18 and 25 to vote. However, the Stanford Social Innovation Review found no evidence of a decline in youth voter turnout. In fact, they argue that "Millennials are turning out at similar rates to the previous two generations when they face their first elections."

Education

Education is another factor considered to have a major impact on voter turnout rates.
A study by Burman investigated the relationship between formal education levels and voter turnout. This study demonstrated the effect of rising enrollment in college education circa 1980s, which resulted in an increase in voter turnout. However, "this was not true for political knowledge"; a rise in education levels did not have any impact in identifying those with political knowledge (a signifier of civic engagement) until the 1980s election, when college education became a distinguishing factor in identifying civic participation. This article poses a multifaceted perspective on the effect of education levels on voter turnout. Based on this article, one may surmise that education has become a more powerful predictor of civic participation, discriminating more between voters and non-voters. However, this was not true for political knowledge; education levels were not a signifier of political knowledge. Gallego (2010) also contends that voter turnout tends to be higher in localities where voting mechanisms have been established and are easy to operate – i.e. voter turnout and participation tends to be high in instances where registration has been initiated by the state and the number of electoral parties is small. 

One may contend that ease of accessand not education levelmay be an indicator of voting behavior. Presumably larger, more urban cities will have greater budgets/resources/infrastructure dedicated to elections, which is why youth may have higher turnout rates in those cities versus more rural areas. Though youth in larger (that is, urban) cities tend to be more educated than those in rural areas (Marcus & Krupnick, 2017), perhaps there is an external variable (i.e. election infrastructure) at play. Smith and Tolbert's (2005) research reiterates that the presence of ballot initiatives and portals within a state have a positive effect on voter turnout. Another correlated finding in his study (Snyder, 2011) was that education is less important as a predictor of voter turnout in states than tend to spend more on education. Moreover, Snyder's (2011) research suggests that students are more likely to vote than non-students. It may be surmised that an increase of state investment in electoral infrastructure facilitates and education policy and programs results in increase voter turnout among youth.

Income

Wealthier people tend to vote at higher rates.
Harder and Krosnick (2008) contend that some of the reasons for this may be due to "differences in motivation or ability (sometimes both)" (Harder and Krosnick, 2008), or that less wealthy people have less energy, time, or resources to allot towards voting. Another potential reason may be that wealthier people believe that they have more at stake if they don't vote than those with less resources or income.
Maslow's hierarchy of needs might also help explain this hypothesis from a psychological perspective. If those with low income are struggling to meet the basic survival needs of food, water, safety, etc., they will not be motivated enough to reach the final stages of "Esteem" or "Self-actualization" needs (Maslow, 1943) – which consist of the desire for dignity, respect, prestige and realizing personal potential, respectively.

Gender gap
Since 1980, the voting gender gap has completely reversed, with a higher proportion of women voting than men in each of the last nine presidential elections. The Center for American Women and Politics summarizes how this trend can be measured differently both in terms of proportion of voters to non-voters, and in terms of the bulk number of votes cast.
"In every presidential election since 1980, the proportion of eligible female adults who voted has exceeded the proportion of eligible male adults who voted [...]. In all presidential elections prior to 1980, the voter turnout rate for women was lower than the rate for men. The number of female voters has exceeded the number of male voters in every presidential election since 1969..." This gender gap has been a determining factor in several recent presidential elections, as women have been consistently about 15% more likely to support the candidate of the Democratic Party than the Republican candidate in each election since 1996.

Race and ethnicity

Race and ethnicity has had an effect on voter turnout in recent years, with data from recent elections such as 2008 showing much lower turnout among people identifying as Hispanic or Asian ethnicity than other voters (see chart to the right). One factor impacting voter turnout of African Americans is that, as of the 2000 election, 13% of African American males are reportedly ineligible to vote nationwide because of a prior felony conviction; in certain states – Florida, Alabama, and Mississippi – disenfranchisement rates for African American males in the 2000 election were around 30%.

Other eligibility factors

Another factor influencing statistics on voter turnout is the percentage of the country's voting-age population who are ineligible to vote due to non-citizen status or prior felony convictions. In a 2001 article in the American Political Science Review, Michael P. McDonald and Samuel Popkin argued, that at least in the United States, voter turnout since 1972 has not actually declined when calculated for those eligible to vote, what they term the voting-eligible population. In 1972, noncitizens and ineligible felons (depending on state law) constituted about 2% of the voting-age population. By 2004, ineligible voters constituted nearly 10%. Ineligible voters are not evenly distributed across the country, roughly 15% of California's voting-age population is ineligible to vote – which confounds comparisons of states.

Turnout statistics 
The following table shows the available data on turnout for the voting-age population (VAP, all residents of voting age, including those not allowed to vote) and voting-eligible population (VEP, VAP minus non-citizens, felons [in some states], and mentally incapacitated citizens) since 1936.

Note: The Bipartisan Policy Center has stated that turnout for 2012 was 57.5 percent of the voting-age population (VAP), which they claim was a decline from 2008. They estimate that as a percent of eligible voters, turnout was: 2000, 54.2%; in 2004 60.4%; 2008 62.3%; and 2012 57.5%. 

The BPC 2012 vote count is low because their document was written just after the 2012 election, before final counts were in. Their voting-eligible population (VEP) does not include adjustments for felons (see p.13). The United States Elections Project, by Michael McDonald calculates VEP including citizenship and adjustments for felons. The site's data on turnout as percentage of eligible voters (VEP), is slightly higher and similar to BPC: 2000 55.3%, 2004 60.7%, 2008 62.2%, 2012 58.6%. McDonald's voter turnout data for 2016 is 60.1% and 50% for 2018.

Later analysis by the University of California, Santa Barbara's American Presidency Project found that there were 235,248,000 people of voting age in the United States in the 2012 election, resulting in 2012 voting age population (VAP) turnout of 54.9%. The total increase in VAP between 2008 and 2012 (5,300,000) was the smallest increase since 1964, bucking the modern average of 8,000,000–13,000,000 per cycle.

See also
 Voter turnout
 Voter registration in the United States

References

Further reading

 Berman, D. and Johnson, R. (2000). Age, ambition, and the local charter: a study in voting behavior. The Social Science Journal, 37(1), pp. 19–26.
 
 Gallego, A. (2010). Understanding unequal turnout: Education and voting in comparative perspective. Electoral Studies, 29(2), pp. 239–248.
 Gershman, C. (2018). Democracy and Democracies in Crisis.
 Harder, J. and Krosnick, J. (2008). Why Do People Vote? A Psychological Analysis of the Causes of Voter Turnout. Journal of Social Issues, 64(3), pp. 525–549.
 Marcus, J., & Krupnick, M. (2017). The Rural Higher-Education Crisis. The Atlantic.
 Maslow, A. (1943). A theory of human motivation. Psychological Review, 50(4), pp. 370–396.
McDonald, Michael, United States Elections Project, http://www.electproject.org/home
 Munsey, C. (2008). Why do we vote ?. American Psychological Association.
 
 Snyder, R. (2011). The impact of age, education, political knowledge and political context on voter turnout. UNLV Theses, Dissertations, Professional Papers, And Capstones.
 Struyk, R. (2017). The Democratic Party has an age problem. CNN. [Accessed June 9, 2018].
 The Economist (2014). Why young people don't vote. [Accessed June 9, 2018].

External links
 "National Turnout Rates, 1787-2018" (United States Election Project) 

United States presidential elections statistics
Voting in the United States